The Honkbal Hoofdklasse (Dutch for Major League Baseball) is the highest level of professional baseball in the Netherlands. It is an eight-team league that plays a 42-game schedule and is overseen by the Royal Netherlands Baseball and Softball Federation (KNBSB).

Games are played principally on weekends. The season runs from April to September and is followed by the playoffs among the four best teams, which culminates in the Holland Series. Both of the playoff rounds are best-of-five. The league follows a promotion and relegation system with the Eerste klasse so that the composition of both levels changes from year to year. Many of the official team nicknames contain the name of the club's corporate sponsor.

The two best teams participate in the European Cup.

History

The Honkbal Hoofdklasse has been the highest level of competitive baseball in the Netherlands since 1958, when it was elevated over the former Eerste Klasse by the Koninklijke Nederlandse Honkbal Bond, the forerunner of the KNBSB. The Eerste Klasse served as the top baseball competition in the Netherlands from its establishment in 1922 until 1957, excluding 1945 when play was suspended due to World War II. The Hoofdklasse has been organized by the KNBSB since 1971.   

Until 1986 the winner of the season was also crowned the national champion, with the exception of 1972 and 1973, when a best-of-five Holland Series was held between the top two teams to determine the champion. Since 1987 the Holland Series has been held annually at the end of the season to determine the national champion. The series is currently held in a best-of-seven format. 

In 2021 the Eerste Klasse was reinstated as the second level of Dutch professional baseball and the league to which teams from the Hoofdklasse are relegated at the end of the season. This was also the case from 1958 to 1986 and 2001 to 2009. In the intervening periods, from 1987 to 2000 and 2010 to 2020, the Overgangsklasse operated as the secondary professional baseball league in the Netherlands. 

Following the 2021 Season the KNBSB decided to end relegation and promotion and operate the Hoofdklasse with fixed teams. The reform is part of broader efforts to improve the league's quality of play and national visibility. The tournament was also expanded to 9 teams for the 2022 season. The Silicon Storks, who were slated to be relegated, will remain in the Hoofdklasse alongside the RCH Pinguins, who had earned a promotion to the top league.

Results

Current clubs

See also
Honkbal Rookie League
Baseball in the Netherlands
Baseball awards#Netherlands
Baseball awards#Europe

References

External links
de Nederlandse honkbalsite (Dutch)
KNBSB (Royal Netherlands Baseball and Softball Federation) (Dutch)
Connor, Joe. Welcome to the Netherlands. ESPN (MLB), January 17, 2006. Retrieved 2009-12-16.
Remington, Alex. Honkbal! Netherlands Bids to Host MLB in 2014. FanGraphs. September 1, 2011. Retrieved 2011-09-03.
2008 Netherlands Baseball All-Star Team and MVP (fan vote at "de Nederlandse honkbalsite"). November 10, 2008. Mister Baseball: All about Baseball & Softball in Europe

 
Baseball competitions in the Netherlands
Baseball leagues in Europe
Sports leagues established in 1922
1922 establishments in the Netherlands
Professional sports leagues in the Netherlands